The 18245 / 18246 Bilaspur–Bikaner Express is an Express train of the Indian Railways connecting  in Chhattisgarh and  in Rajasthan. It is currently operated with train numbers 18245/18246, two days per week.

Service

 18245  Bilaspur–Bikaner Express has an average speed of 53 km/hr and covers 1883 km in 35 hrs and 30 mins.
 18246 Bikaner–Bilaspur Express has an average speed of 51 km/hr and covers 1884 km in 36 hours and 50 minutes.

Route and halts 

The important halts of the train are:

Traction

As the route is yet to be fully electrified, it is hauled by a Bhilai-based WAP-7 from  up to  handing over to a Bhagat Ki Kothi-based WDP-4 / WDP-4B / WDP-4D locomotive for the remainder of the journey until .

Coach composition

The train consists of 24 coaches :

 3 AC II Tier
 3 AC III Tier
 7 Sleeper Coaches
 6 General
 2 Second-class Luggage/parcel van

Direction reversal

The train reverses its direction 3 times:

See also 

 Bikaner–Puri Express

References 
 18245/Bilaspur - Bikaner Express
 18246/Bikaner - Bilaspur Express

Transport in Bilaspur, Chhattisgarh
Transport in Bikaner
Rail transport in Rajasthan
Rail transport in Madhya Pradesh
Rail transport in Chhattisgarh
Express trains in India
Railway services introduced in 2016
2016 establishments in India